5385 Kamenka, provisional designation , is a background asteroid from the outer regions of the asteroid belt, approximately  in diameter. It was discovered on 3 October 1975, by Soviet astronomer Lyudmila Chernykh at the Crimean Astrophysical Observatory in Nauchnij, on the Crimean peninsula. The presumed C-type asteroid has a rotation period of 6.68 hours. It was named for the Ukrainian town of Kamianka.

Orbit and classification 

Kamenka is a non-family asteroid from the main belt's background population. It orbits the Sun in the outer asteroid belt at a distance of 2.4–3.9 AU once every 5 years and 7 months (2,049 days; semi-major axis of 3.16 AU). Its orbit has an eccentricity of 0.23 and an inclination of 10° with respect to the ecliptic. The body's observation arc begins with a precovery taken at Palomar Observatory in March 1955, twenty years prior to its official discovery observation at Nauchnij.

Physical characteristics 

Kamenka is an assumed carbonaceous C-type asteroid.

Rotation period 

Two rotational lightcurves of Kamenka have been obtained from photometric observations at the Palomar Transient Factory and at the Oakley Southern Sky and Oakley Observatory. Lightcurve analysis gave a rotation period of 5.93 and 6.683 hours with a brightness amplitude of 0.26 and 0.15 magnitude, respectively.

Diameter and albedo 

According to the survey carried out by the NEOWISE mission of NASA's Wide-field Infrared Survey Explorer, Kamenka measures between 14.10 and 16.768 kilometers in diameter and its surface has an albedo between 0.083 and 0.11.

The Collaborative Asteroid Lightcurve Link assumes a standard albedo for a carbonaceous asteroid of 0.057 and calculates a diameter of 20.21 kilometers based on an absolute magnitude of 12.2.

Naming 

This minor planet was named after the town of Kamianka, located in the Cherkasy Oblast region of central Ukraine. The official naming citation was published by the Minor Planet Center on 24 January 2000.

References

External links 
 Asteroid Lightcurve Database (LCDB), query form (info )
 Dictionary of Minor Planet Names, Google books
 Discovery Circumstances: Numbered Minor Planets (5001)-(10000) – Minor Planet Center
 
 

005385
Discoveries by Lyudmila Chernykh
Named minor planets
19751003